This a table showing the undergraduate engineering degrees offered at the twenty-three campuses of the California State University system and their accreditation.

Undergraduate programs 

 | 
 |
 |  ||  ||  || 
 |  ||  ||  || 
 |  ||  ||  || 
 | 
 | 3
 |- style="text-align: center;"
 ! Stanislaus State
 |  ||  ||  || 
 |  ||  ||  ||  || 
 |  ||  ||  || 
 |  ||  ||  || 
 |  ||  ||  || 
 |  ||  ||  || 
 |  || 
 | 0
 |- style="background-color: #fc0; font-weight: 700; text-align: center;"
 | ABET Certified || 5 || 1 || 0 || 1 || 3 || 12 || 13 || 12 || 2 || 1 || 0 || 13
 | 1 || 1 || 1 || 3 || 1 || 0 || 1 || 1 || 4 || 1 || 3 || 2 || 13 || 1 || 1 || 97
 |-
 ! Total !! 5 !! 2 !! 1 !! 1 !! 3 !! 12 !! 14 !! 18 !! 4 !! 4 !! 1 !! 15 !! 2
 ! 2 !! 1 !! 4 !! 1 !! 1 !! 1 !! 1 !! 4 !! 1 !! 4 !! 2 !! 13 !! 2 !! 3 !! 122
 |-
 | style="background-color: #fff; border-bottom: 1px solid #fff; border-left: 1px solid #fff; font-weight: 700; text-align: center; vertical-align: top; width: 10em;" | Campus
 ! 
 ! 
 ! 
 ! 
 ! 
 ! 
 ! 
 ! 
 ! 
 ! 
 ! 
 ! 
 ! 
 ! 
 ! 
 ! 
 ! 
 ! 
 ! 
 ! 
 ! 
 ! 
 ! 
 ! 
 ! 
 ! 
 ! 
 | style="background-color: #fff; border-bottom: 1px solid #fff; border-right: 1px solid #fff; font-weight: 700; text-align: center; vertical-align: top; width: 3em;" | Total
|}

Undergraduate accreditation

References 

California State University
Engineering
 
California State University